Kopp Verlag is a German publisher based in Rottenburg am Neckar. It publishes books and an online news website notably in the field of right-wing esotericism, populism and extremism, as well as pseudoscience and conspiracy theories. Other topics include wellness, outdoor equipment, survival skills and self-defense.

Topics and publications
Founded by the former policeman Jochen Kopp, the company ships up to 25,000 books per day and has about 60 employees, according to its own account.

Among the topics addressed by Kopp's books are ancient astronauts, ufology, the phantom time hypothesis, creationism, astrology, geomancy, Germanic mythology, Islamism, Freiwirtschaft and "gender and gender mainstreaming".

In addition to Kopp exklusiv, an eight-page newsletter, the company publishes Kopp Online, a website with articles and previously also videos covering the abovementioned topics. Articles of note include one by Eva Herman approving of the 2010 Love Parade disaster as a response by "other powers" to the "shameless display", one by Udo Ulfkotte about how the 2011 E. coli outbreak was supposedly spread by "oriental" farmhands waging a "fecal jihad", and one by Gerhard Wisnewski about the supposed transsexuality of Michelle Obama.

In addition to its own books and media, Kopp also sells books by other publishers as well as food and survival equipment.

Reception
According to Stefan Kaiser in Spiegel Online, Kopp publishes conspiracy theorists alongside "serious" anti-European authors such as the professors Joachim Starbatty, Wilhelm Nölling, Karl Albrecht Schachtschneider and Dieter Spethmann.

In 2010, Die Welt described Kopp Verlag as a company specializing in "esotericism, conspiracy theories and disinformation", and the  Schwäbisches Tagblatt characterized its range as encompassing "ufology, the 'Germanic New Medicine' of the spirit healer Ryke Geerd Hamer and supposed revelations about the Communist background of ecologism or the Islamization of the West". The Gemeinschaftswerk der Evangelischen Publizistik described Kopp's authors in 2010 as a "who-is-who of German conspiracism", including several authors espousing right-wing and esoteric ideologies.

The FAZ referred to the Kopp-Verlag in 2015 as part of a growing "industry of fear", and Spiegel Online wrote in 2014 that the publisher's "business model of fear" made it, with its "mixture of right-wing populism, anticapitalism and taboo-breaker's attitude" a pioneer of the zeitgeist of anti-political correctness.

On October 29, 2016, the publishing house held another congress in Augsburg, this time on the topic of geopolitics. Speakers were Udo Ulfkotte, Wolfgang Effenberger, F. William Engdahl, Peter Orzechowski and Daniele Ganser.

Authors 
Among the Kopp Verlag's  authors are the following:

References
 Ulrike Heß-Meining: Right-Wing Esotericism in Europe. In: Uwe Backes, Patrick Moreau (Hrsg.): The Extreme Right in Europe. Current Trends and Perspectives (= Schriften des Hannah-Arendt-Instituts für Totalitarismusforschung. Vol. 46). Vandenhoeck & Ruprecht, Göttingen u. a. 2012, S. 383–408, hier: S. 402 f.
 Anna Hunger: Gut vernetzt – Der Kopp-Verlag und die schillernde rechte Publizistenszene. In: Stephan Braun, Alexander Geisler, Martin Gerster (Hrsg.): Strategien der extremen Rechten: Hintergründe – Analysen – Antworten. 2. aktualisierte und erweiterte Auflage, Springer Fachmedien, Wiesbaden 2015, S. 425 ff.

External links

Footnotes

Book publishing companies of Germany
Companies based in Baden-Württemberg
New Right (Europe)